The 2014 Idaho Vandals football team represented the University of Idaho in the 2014 NCAA Division I FBS football season. The Vandals are led by second year head coach Paul Petrino and play their home games on campus in Moscow at the Kibbie Dome. They finished the season 1–10, 1–7 in conference play to finish in a tie for ninth place.

Idaho returned to the Sun Belt Conference as a "football only" member in 2014; they previously competed in the conference in the same capacity from 2001 through 2004. Idaho was an independent for football in 2013. The team was ineligible for postseason play regardless of their final record due to an insufficient Academic Progress Rate.

Schedule

Schedule Source:

The game did not kickoff until 9:50 p.m. due to inclement weather.  The game was again delayed due to lightning after 10 seconds of play during which Florida returned the Idaho kickoff to the Idaho 14-yard line.  The game was called as "suspended" 40 minutes after the second delay due to unsafe field conditions. Both schools' athletic directors decided on September 3 not to reschedule the game, thus declaring it a "no contest". Florida did agree to pay Idaho its promised fee of $975,000 and the schools agreed to schedule a game for the 2018 season.

NFL Draft
No Vandals were selected in the 2015 NFL Draft, but offensive tackle Jesse Davis was signed as an undrafted free agent by the Seattle Seahawks.

References

Idaho
Idaho Vandals football seasons
Idaho Vandals football